Pedro Chourio  (born 13 March, 1990) is a Venezuelan professional basketball player who plays for Spartans Distrito Capital of the Venezuelan SuperLiga. He plays for Estudiantes Concordia of the  LNB.

Club career
Chourio started his professional career at the Trotamundos B.B.C. in the Venezuelan Liga Profesional de Baloncesto in 2011, and played there for 3 consecutive seasons before moving to the Caquetios de Falcon for a season where he averaged 5.33 points.
He returned to Trotamundos B.B.C. in 2014, he stayed at the club until 2018 where he averaged 10.37 points in the 2018 season. He moved to Guaros de Lara and averaged 3.50 points during his stay there.
He moved to Estudiantes Concordia in late 2018 where he averaged 7.79 points per game. He then again returned to Trotamundos B.B.C. in 2019 where he averaged 9.97 points and then returned to Estudiantes Concordia for the 2019–20 season.

Chourio played in the 2020 Venezuelan SuperLiga with Spartans Distrito Capital. He helped the Spartans win its first national title, while earning Finals MVP honours. On February 10, 2021, he re-signed with the team.

National team career
Chourio represented Venezuela at the 2019 FIBA Basketball World Cup where he averaged 4.4 points and 1.6 rebounds at the tournament.

References

Living people
1990 births
Estudiantes Concordia basketball players
Guaros de Lara (basketball) players
Spartans Distrito Capital players
Point guards
Trotamundos B.B.C. players
Venezuelan expatriate basketball people in Argentina
Venezuelan men's basketball players
2019 FIBA Basketball World Cup players